Sindhi Mojari (or simply Mojari) is a type of handcrafted footwear produced in Pakistan. They are traditionally made by artisans mostly using tanned leather. The uppers are made of one piece of leather or textile embroidered and embellished with brass nails, cowry shells, mirrors, bells and ceramic beads. The bonding from the upper to the sole is done by cotton thread that is eco-friendly and enmeshes the leather fibers to strengthen the bonds. Some product range also uses bright and ornate threads.

As it evolved through the centuries and is being produced by individual artisans, products vary in designs and colours. It encapsules cultural diversity, local ethos and ethnicity.

History

It is believed that one of the earliest examples of footwear worn on the Indian subcontinent is a sandal of wood, datable to circa 200 BC. During the 3rd and 4th Centuries in the Buddhist period, it was quite common to wear strapped sandals, and Indian kings wore sandals ornamented with precious jewels. Jain literature shows that leather was used for the making of shoes, which protected the toes from getting injured. Hides of cows, buffaloes, goats, sheep and other wild animals were used.

Origin 
The Mojari originated under the Muslim rule in the Mughal Empire where it was decorated with colours, gems, and other ornaments. They are said to have been popularized under the Mughal King Saleem Shah as a result. In Pakistan, they are also commonly worn with Pakistan's national dress Shalwar Kameez.

See also
 Jutti
 Kolhapuri chappal
 Multani Khussa
 Paduka

References

External links 
 BBC Culture - Includes image of golden mojari of a 19th-century Nizam of Hyderabad 
 Khussa Shop - One of the oldest Khussa Store 

Folk footwear
Indian footwear
Pakistani footwear
Mughal art
Sindhi culture
Indian leather industry